Four Roads Hurling Club are a hurling club from Co. Roscommon. They are the most successful team in the history of the Roscommon Senior Hurling Championship with 35 titles. They also won the Connacht Senior Club Hurling Championship in 1977 due to a walkover from Kiltormer and again 1988 when they defeated Abbeyknockmoy on a scoreline of 3-5 to 1-8. On both occasions of representing Connacht at the All-Ireland semi-final stage, they encountered Wexford opposition. First up was the star-studded Rathnure side of 1978 where they put in an impressive performance before going down by 2-20 to 2-8, and in 1989 they suffered defeat on a scoreline of 2-19 to 0-9 to eventual champions Buffers Alley. Together with emerging twice from Connacht, the club also played in nine other finals. After the Senior Championship finished in 2007, they have played in the Connacht Intermediate Club Hurling Championship making the final 5 times but never won it. In 2015 they won the Roscommon senior hurling title for a record 8th time in a row, bringing them to 33 titles overall.

Achievements
 Roscommon Senior Hurling Championship Winners 1905, 1906, 1907, 1945, 1946, 1948, 1950, 1954, 1958, 1962, 1971, 1977, 1981, 1982, 1983, 1986, 1988, 1991, 1993, 1996, 1997, 2000, 2001, 2002, 2005, 2008, 2009, 2010, 2011, 2012, 2013, 2014, 2015, 2019, 2022
 Connacht Senior Club Hurling Championship Winners 1977, 1988

References

External links
 Four Roads  Hurling Club

Gaelic games clubs in County Roscommon
Hurling clubs in County Roscommon